Paul de Mesmaeker (born 8 September 1963) is a Belgian former professional footballer who played as a left midfielder.

Honours
KV Mechelen
European Cup Winners' Cup: 1987-88
European Super Cup: 1988

References

External links
 
 

1963 births
Living people
People from Oudenaarde
Belgian footballers
Footballers from East Flanders
Association football midfielders
Belgium international footballers
Belgium youth international footballers
Belgian Pro League players
R.W.D.M. Brussels F.C. players
K.V. Mechelen players
Royal Cappellen F.C. players